2014 World U-17 Hockey Challenge may refer to:

 2014 World U-17 Hockey Challenge (January)
 2014 World U-17 Hockey Challenge (November)